Group D of the 2023 UEFA European Under-21 Championship qualifying competition consists of six teams: Portugal, Greece, Iceland, Belarus, Cyprus, and Liechtenstein. The composition of the nine groups in the qualifying group stage was decided by the draw held on 28 January 2021, 12:00 CET (UTC+1), at the UEFA headquarters in Nyon, Switzerland, with the teams seeded according to their coefficient ranking.

Standings

Matches
Times are CET/CEST, as listed by UEFA (local times, if different, are in parentheses).

Goalscorers

Notes

References

External links

Group D